Palm (or Palon) Heinrich Ludwig (Pruß) von Boguslawski (7 September 1789 – 5 June 1851) was a German astronomy professor and observatory director in Breslau (Wrocław).

Early life 
A native of Magdeburg, Boguslawski met Johann Elert Bode (1747–1826), who was an observatory director in Berlin and published the celestial atlas Uranographia, at the Prussian Military Academy in Berlin between 1811 and 1812, when Boguslawski did his military service.

Military service 
Boguslawski was an artillery officer in the Prussian Army during the French invasion of Russia (1812) led by Napoleon. He retired as Hauptmann.

Astronomy 
After the war, he took up residence on his family's lands outside Breslau. In 1831 he became curator at the observatory in Breslau, and was appointed in 1836 to an honorary professorship at the University of Breslau.

In the night from 20 April to 21 April 1835, Boguslawski detected a comet, estimated its course, and reported it to Herr Geheimer Ober-Regierungs-Rath. For this, the comet (also known as 1835 I) was named after him.

He also did valuable observations and calculations of Biela's, Encke's and Halley's Comets, published contributions in astronomy magazines and participated in the publication of the magazine Uranus from 1842 to his death in 1851.

At the university, the mechanics  Ernst Carl Gottfried Wilhelm (1794–1843) and Ernst Karl Gustav Theodor Pinzger (1819–1882) supported him. They also were active for the "Schlesische Gesellschaft für vaterländische Kultur".

Honours 
Boguslawski has the comet he discovered named after him, as well as a lunar crater. Further, he received the first gold comet medal for his work in identifying Comet Boguslawksi. He was awarded the Lalande Prize in 1835.

External links 
 Schreiben des Herrn Hauptmanns v. Boguslawski, Conservators der Breslauer Sternwarte, an den Herausgeber Der Comet muß etwa einen Tag vorher den O. passirt haben ... Der Comet wird hiernach, wie es scheint, gegen den 16ten Nov. durch das Perihel gehen 
 Meyers Konversationslexikon 
 Gauß-Register: Boguslawski, Palm Heinrich Ludwig Pruss von (1789-1851) 
 Handwerkergelehrte und Instrumentenmacher 
 Who's Who in Comet History: Boguslawski, Palm Heinrich Ludwig von (1789-1851)
 Original report of comet in German, Biography in Swedish

19th-century German astronomers
German untitled nobility
Prussian Army personnel of the Napoleonic Wars
Academic staff of the University of Breslau
Scientists from Magdeburg
1789 births
1851 deaths
Recipients of the Lalande Prize